Jon Budmayr (born December 15, 1990) is an American football coach who is currently an offensive analyst for Iowa. He played college football at Wisconsin.

Playing career
Budmayr was a quarterback at Wisconsin from 2009 to 2011 before he retired due to having multiple surgeries regarding nerve issues.

Coaching career
Budmayr stayed at Wisconsin as a student assistant in 2012 and 2013 before going on to Pittsburgh in 2014 as a graduate assistant under his former position coach, Paul Chryst.

Wisconsin (second stint)
Budmayr joined Chryst at Wisconsin in 2015 as a graduate assistant, working with the quarterbacks as there was no official position coach. He was shifted to a quality control assistant the next season, continuing to coach the quarterbacks. When the NCAA approved the hiring of a 10th assistant coach in 2018, Budmayr was officially promoted to quarterbacks coach.

Colorado State
Budmayr was named the offensive coordinator and quarterbacks coach at Colorado State on February 4, 2021. He was replaced by Matt Mumme after one season at CSU as head coach Steve Addazio was fired.

Iowa
In 2022 he became an offensive analyst for Iowa.

References

External links
 
 Wisconsin coach profile
 Wisconsin player profile

1990 births
Living people
American football quarterbacks
Iowa Hawkeyes football coaches
Colorado State Rams football coaches
Pittsburgh Panthers football coaches
Wisconsin Badgers football coaches
Wisconsin Badgers football players
People from Woodstock, Illinois
Coaches of American football from Illinois
Players of American football from Illinois